Ulfcytel or Ulfketil may refer to:

 Ulfcytel Snillingr (died 1016), Anglo-Saxon nobleman
 Ulfketil, Bishop of Aarhus, 12th century bishop in the Ancient See of Aarhus